Schachter v. Canada [1992] 2 S.C.R. 679 is the leading Supreme Court of Canada decision on the remedy provisions in sections 24(1) of the Charter and 52(1) of the Constitution Act, 1982.  The Court provides a list of remedies available under each section. 

Under section 52(1), the impugned law may be subject to any number of remedies: the law may be struck down completely, it may be suspended until remedied by the legislature, it may be read down to avoid the violation, an omission may be read into the law, or the impugned provision may be severed. 

Under section 24(1), the victim of the impugned law may apply for either a constitutional exemption, an injunction, or damages.

See also
 List of Supreme Court of Canada cases (Lamer Court)

External links
 

Supreme Court of Canada cases
1992 in Canadian case law
Supreme Court of Canada case articles without infoboxes